The fourth season of The L Word premiered on January 7, 2007 and ended on March 25, 2007. 12 episodes were produced this season.

Cast

Production
Showtime announced a renewal of the series, in a February 2, 2006, press release:
On the heels of a year highlighted by industry recognition and critical acclaim for its award-winning original programming including Weeds, Huff and Sleeper Cell, Showtime has ordered a fourth season of its hit drama series The L Word.

The filming of the season's twelve episodes began in Vancouver, on May 29, 2006.

New cast members for the show's fourth season included Academy-Award winner Marlee Matlin, three time Golden Globe winner Cybill Shepherd, Kristanna Loken, Rose Rollins, Jessica Capshaw and Janina Gavankar. Karina Lombard reprised her role as Marina Ferrer for two episodes. Film and television star Annabella Sciorra guest-starred in several episodes as lesbian film director Kate Arden, chosen to direct the film version of Jenny's story Lez Girls.

Episodes

References

External links

The L Word